Turchino Lake  is a lake in the Province of Modena, Emilia-Romagna, Italy. At an elevation of 1600 m, its surface area is 0.0625 km2.

Lakes of Emilia-Romagna